"Dangerously" is a song by American singer-songwriter Charlie Puth. It was sent to Italian radio stations as the fourth and final single from his debut studio album Nine Track Mind, on December 2, 2016.

Music video
The official music video was released on November 2, 2016, on YouTube. It was directed by Aya Tanimura. It has more than 128 million views as of July 2022.

Charts

Weekly charts

Monthly charts

Certifications

References

2016 songs
Atlantic Records singles
Charlie Puth songs
Songs written by Charlie Puth
Songs written by J. R. Rotem
Song recordings produced by J. R. Rotem
2016 singles
Songs written by Eskeerdo
Songs written by James Abrahart